Hongtaizhuang station is a station under construction on Line 16 of the Beijing Subway.

History 
In April 2020, the Beijing Municipal Commission of Development and Reform decided to build Yushuzhuang North station.
On September 1, 2022, the station was renamed as Hongtaizhuang station. On November 1, 2022, the station was officially named as Hongtaizhuang.

Station layout 
The station has an underground island platform.

References 

Railway stations under construction in China
Beijing Subway stations in Fengtai District